Timothy Buzza (born April 19, 1964) is an American engineer, former vice president at SpaceX and Virgin Orbit, and currently a distinguished engineer at Relativity Space. He is most notable for his influence in the early years of the commercial space industry.

Early life 
Buzza was born April 19, 1964, in Key West, Florida to Glenn and Carolanne Buzza, He was one of four children. In his first years of life, he attended Moon Area High School. He later attended Pennsylvania State University, where he wrestled.

Buzza earned both a bachelor’s degree and his master’s degree in mechanical engineering from Penn State.

Career 
Buzza's first job was with McDonnell Douglas. He spent the next 14 years working on aircraft (specifically MD-11 and C-17s) and the Delta IV launch Vehicle. However, after the company started to merge with Boeing, Buzza began looking for new opportunities. That is when he was approached about a new startup called SpaceX. He started work at the company almost immediately.

During his 12-year career at SpaceX Buzza advanced to become the Vice President of Test and Launch while leading the design, construction and operation of launch/test sites in Florida, Kwajalein, Texas, and California. He was also directly involved with the development of Falcon 1, Falcon 9, and the SpaceX Dragon 1 Spacecraft. He worked directly with CEO Elon Musk, President Gwynne Shotwell, VP of Propulsion Tom Mueller, and VP of Mission Assurance Hans Koenigsmann

In 2014, Buzza joined Virgin Galactic as the Vice President of Program Development.

In 2017 Buzza transitioned to Vice President of Launch for Virgin Orbit (formerly part of Virgin Galactic)

In 2018, Buzza joined Relativity Space as Distinguished Engineer.

References

Further reading

 http://www.virgingalactic.com/who-we-are/our-team/
 http://www.parabolicarc.com/2016/06/28/virgin-galactic-taps-tim-buzza-lead-launcherone-program/
 http://www.jsc.nasa.gov/history/oral_histories/C3PO/BuzzaT/BuzzaT_1-15-13.htm 
 http://www.mne.psu.edu/news/15-OEA-Awards.aspx
 https://www.wired.com/2007/05/ff-space-musk/
 https://qz.com/787644/elon-musks-dream-of-going-to-mars-is-spacexs-biggest-strength-and-its-biggest-distraction/
 https://intelliversitycampus.org/spacex-and-elon-musks-secret-weapon/
 https://www.wired.com/2008/05/launch-pad-demo

Living people
21st-century American engineers
Penn State College of Engineering alumni
1964 births